Kota Kemuning is a state constituency in Selangor, Malaysia, that has been represented in the Selangor State Legislative Assembly since 2018.

The state constituency was created in the 2003 redistribution and is mandated to return a single member to the Selangor State Legislative Assembly under the first past the post voting system.

Demographics

History

Polling districts 
According to the federal gazette issued on 30 March 2018, the Kota Kemuning constituency is divided into 14 polling districts.

Representation history

Election results

References

Selangor state constituencies